Bonaventure Baron, O.F.M. (christened Bartholomew Baron; 1610 – 18 March 1696) was a distinguished Irish Franciscan friar and a noted theologian, philosopher, teacher and writer of Latin prose and verse.

Biography
Baron was born at Clonmel, County Tipperary. His mother, one of 14 children, was a sister of the Irish Jesuit priest, Father Ambrose Baron.  Franciscan friar and historian Father Luke Wadding was another of Baron's uncles. His brother, Geoffrey acted for the Irish Confederates in their negotiations with the continental rulers.

Bartholomew Baron joined the Franciscan community of Clonmel, pursued his studies in philosophy at the Old University of Leuven. Afterwards he proceeded to the Irish College of St Isidore in Rome, founded by his uncle, Father Wadding. Upon the completion of his theological courses, he was appointed professor and devoted himself specially to a defense of the Scotist system then generally assailed. During his stay in Rome he published numerous works on theology, philosophy and history, all listed below. 

Ordained in 1634, he took the religious name Bonaventure. Around 1651 he left Rome, and went first to a house of his Order at Schwaz in Tyrol, and then to Salzburg, where he was kindly received by Archbishop Guidobald. He was sent as commissary into Habsburg Hungary (about 1656), was again in Schwaz (1661), went to Paris, taught for some time at Würzburg, where he published a volume of his "Opuscula" (1668), taught theology at Lyon in southern France and finally returned to Italy. It is said that representations were made to secure his appointment to the Archbishopric of Cashel, but that he declined the office. He was appointed historiographer in 1676 by Cosmo I de' Medici, Grand-duke of Tuscany and was elected a member of the Academy of Florence.
 
He died on 18 March 1696, and was buried at St Isidore in Rome, where his tomb with the inscription, written by John de Burgo, a rector of the college, still exists. Two contemporary oil paintings of him have come down to us: one is in the Franciscan friary in Clonmel, the other in a Franciscan friary in Dublin. There is also a fresco of Bonaventure in the aula of St. Isidore's College in Rome.

Writings
While under the patronage of the Grand Duke he published the "Trias Tuscia", in honor of three remarkable religious of Tuscany, and in the same year the "Orbes Medicei". 
 
His principal works are:
 "Panegyrici Sacroprophani" (Rome, 1643; Lyon, 1656)
 "Obsidio et expugnatio Arcis Duncannon sub Thoma Preston"
 "Praelusiones Philosophicae" (Rome, 1651; Lyon, 1661); "Boetius Absolutus" (Rome, 1653)
 "Scotus defensus et amplificatus" (3 volumes, Cologne, 1664)
 "Cursus Theologicus" (6 volumes, 1670)
 "Opuscula" (4 volumes of 'small works', 1666–71)
 "Annales Ordinis Sanctae Trinitatis pro redemptione captivorum ab anno 1198 usque ad annum 1297" (Rome, 1864), his last work, a history of the Order for Redemption of Captives (Trinitarians), from 1198 till 1297.

See also
 Froinsias Ó Maolmhuaidh
 Proinsias Ó Doibhlin
 Concobhar Ó Duibheannaigh
 Thomas de Hibernia

References

Attribution
 
 

1610 births
1696 deaths
17th-century Irish Roman Catholic priests
Franciscan scholars
Irish expatriates in Italy 
Irish Friars Minor
KU Leuven alumni
People from Clonmel 
Scotism
Date of birth unknown